Zdeněk Ziegler (20 July 1926 – 6 May 2022) was a Czechoslovak sprint canoer who competed in the mid-1950s. He won a bronze medal in the C-2 10000 m event at the 1954 ICF Canoe Sprint World Championships in Mâcon.
"In 1953, as a canoeist, I won the title of master of sports and I started riding in pairs with my colleague Sieger. However, he was a little younger and worked in the war and then the ÚDA Prague, the successor to ATK, and so that we could train together I became a civilian employee of the army." The last matches that he played were for ÚDA Prague in 1954–55.
He rowed two kilometers a day every day in his town Holoubkov until his death.

References

1926 births
2022 deaths
Czech male canoeists
Czechoslovak male canoeists
ICF Canoe Sprint World Championships medalists in Canadian
Canoeists from Prague